Preman may refer to:
 Human evolution
 Preman (Indonesian gangster)
 Preman (film), a 2021 Indonesian action film